The Shot of the Week Award at the annual Tim Hortons Brier is presented to the individual curler who executes the most outstanding shot during the tournament.  The award has been presented since 1997.  The inaugural winner was Kevin Martin of Alberta.  The current holder of the award is Brad Gushue.

From 1997 to 2009 the award was selected by the Brier's statisticians. From 2010 to 2013, the award was selected by TSN. It has not been presented since.

Winners

References

The Brier
Curling trophies and awards